The Marianas Soccer League is the men's top level professional football competition of the Northern Mariana Islands Football Association.

History
The league began as an invitational league in the Northern Mariana Islands. The league has been operating since 2005 and grew to include eight teams in the 2008 season.

On 2 August 2012 the competition was re-branded as the M-League, following the suit of many other AFC national competitions. 
In September 2012, the Northern Mariana Islands Football Association (NMIFA) officially launched a two tier completion, usually without promotion and relegation. In the inaugural season there were 5 teams in Division 1 and 4 teams in generally amateur Division 2.

After the 2020 season was abandoned due to the COVID-19 pandemic, the league was relaunched in Spring 2021 as the Marianas Soccer League.

Previous winners
Champions so far are:

Northern Mariana Invitational Championship
2005: not held
2006–07: L&S/Lyung-Seung
2007: Fiesta Inter Saipan
2008 Spring: Inter Godfather's
2008 Fall: Inter Godfather's
2009: Inter Godfather's
2010: MP United
2011: Inter Godfather's

M-League Division 1
2012 Spring: Wild Bills
2012 Fall: Tan Holdings
2013 Spring: Wild Bills
2013–14: Wild Bills
2014 Fall: MP United
2015 Spring: Tan Holdings
2015 Fall: not held
2016 Spring: Tan Holdings
2016 Fall: MP United
2017 Spring: MP United
2017 Fall: Tan Holdings
2018 Spring: MP United
2018 Fall: abandoned
2019 Spring: Teen Ayuyu
2019 Fall: All Blue
2020 Spring: abandoned
2020 Fall: not held

Marianas Soccer League
2021 Spring: Tan Holdings
2021 Fall: All Blue
2022 Spring: Eleven Tigers

Top goalscorers
Note: 2007–10 top goalscorers for Northern Mariana Invitational Championship.

References

 
Football competitions in the Northern Mariana Islands
Top level football leagues in Asia
Sports leagues established in 2005